The 2005–06 Ohio Bobcats women's basketball team represented Ohio University during the 2005–06 NCAA Division I women's basketball season. The Bobcats, led by seventh year head coach Lynn Bria, in her final year, played their home games at the Convocation Center in Athens, Ohio as a member of the Mid-American Conference. They finished the season 9–20 and 5–11 in MAC play.

Preseason
The preseason poll was announced by the league office on October 26, 2005. Ohio was picked fourth in the MAC East.

Preseason women's basketball poll 
(First place votes in parenthesis)

East Division 
  (17) 132
  (6) 117
  93
 Ohio 68
  40
  33

West Division 
  (20) 132
  (3) 99
  86
  83
  44
  39

Tournament Champion 
Bowling Green (15), Kent State (5), Eastern Michigan (4), Western Michigan (1)

Schedule

|-
!colspan=9 style=| Non-conference regular season

|-

|-
!colspan=9 style=| MAC regular season

|-
!colspan=9 style=| MAC Tournament

|-

Awards and honors

All-MAC Awards

References

Ohio
Ohio Bobcats women's basketball seasons
Ohio Bobcats women's basketball
Ohio Bobcats women's basketball